Hiemer is a German surname. Notable people with the surname include:

Ernst Hiemer (1900–1974), German writer
Manuel Hiemer (born 1985), German footballer
Uli Hiemer (born 1962), German ice hockey player

See also
Riemer

German-language surnames